South German natural gas pipeline was a natural gas pipeline project in Germany. It was planned to run from Burghausen on the German-Austrian border to Lampertheim, state of Hesse. The pipeline was to be constructed jointly by E.ON Ruhrgas and Wingas, a joint venture of Wintershall and Russian Gazprom. The project was expected to cost €600 million ($759.2 million). Project was stopped in November 2008, mainly due to difficulties in financing. According to Wingas, the pipeline project was not economically sustainable; hence the halt of operations.

References

Natural gas pipelines in Germany